Perth and East Perthshire was a county constituency of the House of Commons of the Parliament of the United Kingdom from 1950 to 1983. It elected one Member of Parliament (MP) by the first past the post system of election.

Boundaries 

The constituency was defined by the House of Commons (Redistribution of Seats) Act 1949 and first used in the 1950 general election. The boundaries were exactly those of the preceding Perth constituency, and it was one of two constituencies covering the county of Perth and the county of Kinross. The other was Kinross and West Perthshire.

The Perth and East Perthshire constituency was defined as covering the burghs of Abernethy, Alyth, Blairgowrie, Coupar Angus, Perth, and Rattray in the county of Perth and the Blairgowrie, and Perth districts of the county.

1950 boundaries were used also for the general elections of 1951, 1955, 1959, 1964, 1966 and 1970.

For the February 1974 general election, the results of the Second Periodical Review of the Boundary Commission were implemented, and there was a minor change to the boundaries of Perth and East Perthshire. It was redefined as covering the burghs of Abernethy, Alyth, Blairgowrie and Rattray (now a single burgh), Coupar Angus, and Perth in the county of Perth, and the Eastern, and Perth districts of the county.

February 1974 boundaries were used also in the general elections of October 1974 and 1979.

In 1975, under the Local Government (Scotland) Act 1973, counties and burghs throughout Scotland had been abolished in favour of regions and districts and islands council areas. The county of Kinross and most of the county of Perth had been merged into the Tayside region. The burghs of Callander, Doune, and Dunblane in the county of Perth, the Perth parish of Muckhart and the Western district of the county (except the electoral division of Ardoch) had been merged into the Central region.

New constituency boundaries, taking account of new local government boundaries, were adopted for the 1983 general election. Constituencies defined to cover the Tayside region included Perth and Kinross.

Members of Parliament

Election results

Elections in the 1950s

Elections in the 1960s

Elections in the 1970s

Notes and references 

Historic parliamentary constituencies in Scotland (Westminster)
Politics of Perth and Kinross
Constituencies of the Parliament of the United Kingdom established in 1950
Constituencies of the Parliament of the United Kingdom disestablished in 1983